The 2019–20 Ottawa Senators season was the 28th season of the Ottawa Senators of the National Hockey League (NHL). The Senators attempted to return to the playoffs after missing the playoffs in the past two seasons.

The season was suspended by the league officials on March 12, 2020, after several other professional and collegiate sports organizations followed suit as a result of the ongoing COVID-19 pandemic. On May 26, the NHL regular season was officially declared over with the remaining games being cancelled and the Senators missed the playoffs for the third straight year.

Team business
On October 5, 2019, the Senators announced that Chris Phillips would have his jersey number (#4) retired by the team on February 18, 2020. He is the third Senators' player to have their jersey retired by the franchise, the others being Daniel Alfredsson's #11, and original Senator Frank Finnigan's #8.

The team named a new CEO in January 2020. The team had operated without a permanent one since 2018. Owner Eugene Melnyk had temporarily filled the post. The team named Jim Little who had served as executive VP and chief marketing and culture officer with Shaw Communications. Little was given the priority to repair community relations and boost ticket attendance among other business issues. Less than two months later, the Senators dismissed Little on March 4, 2020, and promised to announce a new CEO within a few weeks's time.

Off-season
In May 2019, the Ottawa Senators announced that D. J. Smith agreed to a three-year contract to be the team's head coach. The team filled out the coaching staff by hiring associate coach Jack Capuano, assistant coach Davis Payne, assistant coach Bob Jones and video coach Mike King. Capuano and Payne are both former head coaches in the NHL. Goaltending coach Pierre Groulx was retained from the previous staff.

Regular season
The Senators started their season with a 5–3 loss to the Toronto Maple Leafs on October 2. Scott Sabourin scored a goal in his NHL debut during the season opener.

Veteran player Bobby Ryan missed approximately three months while attending an NHL player assistance program. It was later revealed by Ryan that he had entered the program due to ongoing struggles with alcohol abuse. He would return to NHL action on February 25 in an away game versus the Nashville Predators. In his first post-rehab home game on February 27, Ryan made headlines by scoring his fifth career hat trick.

At the trade deadline in February 2020, the club continued to build for the future, trading away Dylan DeMelo, Jean-Gabriel Pageau, Vladislav Namestnikov and Tyler Ennis for draft picks. All were pending unrestricted free agents. After the trades, the Senators hold a total of 13 2020 NHL Entry Draft draft picks, including three in the first round and four in the second round.

The season was suspended by the NHL on March 12, 2020, after several other professional and collegiate sports organizations followed suit as a result of the ongoing COVID-19 pandemic. On March 17, it was announced that an unnamed Senators player had tested positive for the virus, the first case identified among NHL players. The team announced on March 21 that a second player has also tested positive.

Standings

Divisional standings

Eastern Conference

Schedule and results

Pre-season
The pre-season schedule was published on June 18, 2019.

Regular season
The regular season schedule was published on June 25, 2019.

Players

Statistics

Skaters

Goaltenders

†Denotes player spent time with another team before joining the Senators. Stats reflect time with the Senators only.
‡No longer with team.
Bold denotes team leader in that category.

Awards and honours

Milestones

Transactions
The Senators have been involved in the following transactions during the 2019–20 season.

Trades

Free agents

Waivers

Contract terminations

Retirement

Signings

Draft picks

Below are the Ottawa Senators' selections at the 2019 NHL Entry Draft, which was held on June 21 and 22, 2019, at Rogers Arena in Vancouver, British Columbia, Canada.

Notes:
 The Columbus Blue Jackets' first-round pick went to the Ottawa Senators as the result of a trade on February 22, 2019, that sent Matt Duchene and Julius Bergman to Columbus in exchange for Vitalii Abramov, Jonathan Davidsson, a conditional first-round pick in 2020 and this pick (being conditional at the time of the trade).
 The New York Rangers' second-round pick went to the Ottawa Senators as the result of a trade on June 22, 2019, that sent Florida's second-round pick and Pittsburgh's third-round pick both in 2019 (44th and 83rd overall) to Carolina in exchange for this pick.

References

Ottawa Senators seasons
Ottawa Senators
Senators
2019 in Ontario
2020 in Ontario
2010s in Ottawa
2020s in Ottawa